Ali Imam Majumder is a former Cabinet Secretary of Bangladesh. He is the Secretary General of Transparency International Bangladesh executive committee member of Citizens for Good Governance (SHUJAN).

Early life 
Majumder was born in 1950 in Kulubari Village, Sonamura, Tripura, India. He migrated to East Pakistan and settled in Comilla in 1962. He graduated from University of Chittagong and graduated with a Masters in Mathematics.

Career 
Majumder joined the Bangladesh Civil Service on 11 February 1977 as an administration cadre.

Majumder served as the District Commissioner (DC) of Sylhet District and Cox's Bazar District in 1997.

In 2004, Majumder was the Secretary of the Ministry of Labour and Employment.

On 31 October 2006, Majumder was appointed the Principal Secretary of the Chief Advisor of the Caretaker Government. On 6 December 2006, he also became the Cabinet Secretary of Bangladesh. In May 2007, he approved a proposal to raise the ranks of the heads of the three armed forced forces of Bangladesh. On 19 November 2007, he term was extended by one year. He reported that the proclamation of Independence of Bangladesh document had gone missing from government custody. He also served as the chairman of Sonali Bank. He retired from the civil service on 28 November 2008.

In March 2015, Majumder was relieved of contempt charges by a court; related to a case against David Bergman.

On 27 October 2016, Majumder was elected to the Trustee Board of Transparency International Bangladesh. He was considered for the post of commissioner of the Election Commission in 2017. He criticized the government providing interest free loans to civil service officers to buy cars. He also had criticized the top heavy nature of Bangladesh Civil Service. He has been critical of the Awami League government politicizing the bureaucracy and reducing the quality of the service.

Majumder is a former Chairperson of Bangladesh Biman. He is an executive committee member of Citizens for Good Governance (SHUJAN). He is a director of MIDAS Financing Limited. In November 2021, Majumder noting the International Institute for Democracy and Electoral Assistance report concurred that democracy was in decline in Bangladesh. He is a director of MIDAS (Micro Industries Development Assistance and Services).

References 

Living people
1950 births
University of Chittagong alumni
Bangladeshi civil servants
People from Tripura
Bangladeshi activists